Jay Bird or Jaybird or variation, may refer to:

 Jay, several species of birds in the crow family, Corvidae
 Blue jay (Cyanocitta cristata)

Places
 Jaybird, Ohio, USA; an unincorporated community in Adams County
 Jay Bird Springs, Georgia, USA; an unincorporated community in Dodge County
 Jaybird Island, Lake Kapowsin, Pierce County, Washington, USA; an island
 Jaybird Creek, a tributary of the Siletz River in Oregon, USA
 Jaybird Pond, Oxford County, Maine, USA; see List of lakes of Maine
 Jay Bird Mine, Carberry Creek, Oregon, USA; see List of mines in Oregon
 Jay Bird Mine, Granite, Oregon, USA; see List of mines in Oregon

People
 Jay Bird (footballer) (born 2001), English footballer
 Jaybird Coleman (1896–1950) U.S. country blues musician
 Jerry "Jaybird" Drennan, a U.S. musician, and former associate of The Picks

Fictional characters
 Jason "Jaybird" Watkins, a character from the U.S. comedy TV show The Last O.G.
 Jaybird, a character from Adventure Time (season 3)

Groups, companies, organizations
 The Jaybirds, a UK blues rock band
 Jaybird (company), a Utah-based consumer electronics company
 The Jay Bird Democrats, a political faction involved in the Jaybird–Woodpecker War
 Cleveland Jaybirds, a softball team

Arts and entertainment
 The Jay Bird, a 1920 short Western film
 The Jaybird, a 1932 novel by MacKinlay Kantor
 "Jaybird", a 2006 song by Comets on Fire off the album Avatar
 "Jaybird", a 2008 tune from the film The Lazarus Project, off the soundtrack album
 "Jaybird", a 2011 song by The Coathangers off the album Larceny & Old Lace

Other uses
 VJ-21 Jaybird, an aircraft; see List of civil aircraft
 Software: Jaybird, a JDBC driver for Firebird (database server)

See also

 Ziryab (789–857), Islamic golden age polymath and artist

 Jay (disambiguation)
 Bird (disambiguation)
 Blue jay (disambiguation)
 Sojka (disambiguation)